Radioactive Man may refer to:
Radioactive Man (comics), a fictional character in the Marvel Comics Universe
Radioactive Man (The Simpsons), a fictional comic book superhero in The Simpsons
Radioactive Man, a comic book series starring the above Simpsons character 
Radioactive Man (The Simpsons episode), an episode of The Simpsons
Radioactive Man (musician), a recording pseudonym of British dance producer Keith Tenniswood